Sigurd Valvatne  (1 May 1913 – 17 December 2004) was a Norwegian naval officer.

He was born in Kvinnherad to Arnfinn Valvatne and Kaia Sundnes. He graduated as naval officer in 1937, and further graduated from submarine training in 1939. During the Second World War he served as submarine commander. His war decorations include the Norwegian War Cross with Sword, the St. Olav's Medal with Oak Branch, the Norwegian War Medal, the Defence Medal 1940–1945, and the Haakon VII 70th Anniversary Medal, the British Distinguished Service Order, the Distinguished Service Cross, the Atlantic Star and the 1939–1945 Star. He continued a military career after the Second World War. From 1963 to 1969 he served as head of the Admiral Staff. He was decorated Knight of the Danish Order of the Dannebrog.

Selected works
In 1954 he wrote the book Med norske ubåter i kamp.

References

1913 births
2004 deaths
People from Kvinnherad
Royal Norwegian Navy personnel of World War II
Recipients of the War Cross with Sword (Norway)
Knights of the Order of the Dannebrog
Companions of the Distinguished Service Order
Recipients of the Distinguished Service Cross (United Kingdom)